Interlake High School (IHS) is a public secondary school in Bellevue, Washington, one of the four traditional high schools in the Bellevue School District. Its mascot is a Saint Bernard named Bernie, and the school's sports teams are known as the "Saints."

History 
Interlake High School opened in 1968. In 1997, Interlake began offering the International Baccalaureate program.

In 2003, most of the school was torn to the ground and rebuilt while its students continued to attend class in portables. The new building opened at the beginning of the 2005-2006 school year.

Students

Clubs and Activities 
Interlake High School hosts multiple clubs, which include co-ed sports clubs such as the Badminton Club. A variety of STEM clubs also exist, including clubs such as an Aviation Club known as the Interlake Aviation Club, a Robotics Club known as Saints Robotics, a Programming and Computer Vision club, Game Development, Rocketry Club, Coding for Medicine Club, Science Club and Math Club.  Other clubs include National Honor Society,Speech and Debate, Junior Statesmen of America, DECA, Key Club, a Model United Nations club, HOSA, newspaper club known as the Interlake Inquirer, a Stocks club and Taichi club and Spirit Squads like Cheer and Drill.

AL Program 
The AL program at Interlake is part of the Advance Placement program offered in the Bellevue School District for grades 2 through 12.

The AL program is a selective program; in which applicants must have a minimum score of 144 on the Cognitive Abilities Test. Reading and Quantitative scores must be of the 90th percentile or higher, one of which must be at or above the 97th percentile. Students who usually partake in the AL Program usually graduate from the middle school AL Program offered in two Bellevue School District schools; Odle Middle School and Tyee Middle School. The high school AL program  continued from the middle school AL Program extends the science, english, and social studies classes further in the International Baccalaureate (IB) program. In the IB program, AL students complete the IB diploma during 10th and 11th grade, rather than the usual 11th and 12th grade.

Notable alumni 

 Michael Allan – former NFL tight end
 Larry Andersen – former MLB pitcher 
 Brad Barquist – highest finishing American in the 10k at the 1996 Olympics and current Interlake cross country and track coach
 Chris DeGarmo – former Guitarist for the Grammy-nominated band Queensrÿche
 Luke Esser – former state senator and chairman of the Washington State Republican Party
 Tom Flick – former NFL quarterback
 Alex Love – flyweight boxer
 Bobby McAllister – soccer player and the cofounder of Sozo Sports
 Dick McCormick – former U.S. soccer midfielder
 Jim Mora – former NFL head coach
 John Olerud – former MLB first baseman
 Timothy Omundson – professional actor, currently on Psych (USA Network)
 Scott Pelluer – former NFL linebacker
 Steve Pelluer – former NFL quarterback
 Matt Pitman – former public address announcer of the NBA's Seattle SuperSonics
 Chuck Swirsky – radio play by play announcer  of the NBA's Chicago Bulls
 Greg Whiteley – film director, producer, and writer
 Nancy Wilson (rock musician) – co-leader with her sister Ann of the band Heart; class of 1972
 Michael Wilton – lead guitarist for the Grammy-nominated band Queensrÿche
 Brian Wood – anchor and reporter for KATU-TV in Portland, Oregon

References

External links 
 

High schools in King County, Washington
Bellevue School District
International Baccalaureate schools in Washington (state)
Educational institutions established in 1968
Public high schools in Washington (state)